PWCT is a free open source visual programming language for software development.

Goal 
Programming Without Coding Technology (PWCT) is designed to be a general-purpose visual programming language that can be used for applications and systems development. PWCT can also be used for introducing programming concepts. The project was founded in December 2005 as a free-open source project that supports designing applications through visual programming then generating the source code. The software supports code generation in many textual programming languages.

The environment support the time dimension where the programmer can play programs as a movie to learn how to create them step-by-step and get better understanding of the program logic. Changing time is done using a
timeline slider which allow the programmer to select a specific point in time to view.

History

 PWCT was registered on SourceForge in December 2005
 PWCT 1.0 was released on 18 October 2008
 PWCT 1.1 was released on 20 February 2009
 PWCT 1.2 was released on 4 May 2009
 PWCT 1.3 was released on 30 May 2009
 PWCT 1.4 was released on 28 August 2009
 PWCT 1.5 was released on 27 March 2010
 PWCT 1.6 was released on 16 May 2010
 PWCT 1.7 was released on 15 September 2010
 PWCT 1.8 was released on 18 October 2011 (Last update : 22 April 2013)
 PWCT 1.9 was released on 7 May 2013 (Latest update : 2 January 2021)

Concept

The PWCT architecture contains three main layers:
 The VPL Layer that provide functionality to perform a specific task.
 The Middle Layer that provide interface between the User view and the System Layer.
 The System Layer that generate executable code in different languages.

The visual source inside PWCT is designed using the Goal Designer where the programmer can generate the steps tree through the interaction with the visual language components.

Inside PWCT, the visual source is a collection of goals, each goal contains tree of steps and each step/node inside the steps tree may contain one or more of data entry forms. Steps tree uses colors that tell the programmer about the step type. Some steps allow containing sub steps, other steps do not allow this, also some steps are not more than comments for the programmer. The steps tree gives the programmer two dimensions where the relationship between the node and another node could be "next to" or "contains" where the programmer can go depth-first or breadth-first when he/she interacts with the steps tree.

The programmer can use the dimension "contains" to do an operation on a group of steps/nodes at the same time (move up / move down / cut/ copy / delete).

The programmer can use the form designer to design the user interface.

The programmer can use the time dimension where he/she can know when each step is created (Date & Time) and can move along the time dimension to see only the steps at any point during the development process.

Inside the Goal Designer, the user can use the mouse or the keyboard to select the visual components and generate new steps in the steps tree. Using the mouse we can explore the environment to see the components that are ready for use. Using the Keyboard by typing the component name, the programmer can quickly get any component and start using it.

Features
 General-purpose.
 Visual Programming (More than one dimension, No Syntax Errors, Time Dimension and Colors).
 Visual Editor (Keyboard shortcuts, Customization, Cut, Copy, Paste, Search and Replace)
 Syntax Directed Editor (Avoid Errors).
 Free Editor and VPL Compiler.
 The programmer can see and edit the generated source code.
 The programmer can change the step name and the steps colors.
 Support code generation in C, Python, C#, Harbour and Supernova programming languages.
 The programmer can play programs as movie to learn how to create the program step by step
 Don't force a programming paradigm.
 Extension (Create new components).
 Run programs at any point in the past during the development process.

Visual languages

The PWCT visual programming language components are classified into the next categories 

 CPWCT : Visual Components that generate source code in the C programming language.
 PythonPWCT : Visual Components that generate source code in the Python programming language.
 HarbourPWCT : Visual Components that generate source code in the Harbour programming language.
 SupernovaPWCT : Visual Components that generate source code in the Supernova programming language.
 C#PWCT : Visual Components that generate source code in the C# programming language.

Criticism
 The PWCT software still requires that the user have a familiarity of programming structures such as the While-Loop and the If-Then. Syntax errors are decreased but the logic and analysis of the program solution are still created, developed and judged by the user.
 PWCT try to innovate and provide a new way of viewing software design, However, such innovation comes at a cost. PWCT focuses on the visualization of code blocks in a structure that they describe as a "Steps Tree", which mirrors the nested structure seen in regular textual programming languages. Also PWCT do not have strong inherent support for visualizing code as diagrams, no strong support for Abstraction Layered Architecture (ALA) applications.

See also

 Alice (software)
 LabVIEW
 Lava (programming language)
 Prograph
 Scratch (programming language)
 Visual programming language

References

Further reading 
 Fayed, Al-Qurishi, Alamri, et al. (2020) PWCT: a novel general-purpose visual programming language in support of pervasive application development, Springer
 Fayed, Al-Qurishi, Alamri, Aldariseh (2017) PWCT: visual language for IoT and cloud computing applications and systems, ACM
 Fayed (2017) General-Purpose Visual Language and Information System with Case-Studies in Developing Business Applications, King Saud University
 Fayed (2013) Using C#.NET through Programming Without Coding Technology, Code Project
 Fayed (2013) Using Python inside Programming Without Coding Technology, Code Project
 Fayed (2013) The Time Machine and the PWCT Visual Programming Language, Code Project

External links
 

Computer languages
Visual programming languages